General José António da Rocha Beleza Ferraz (born 9 September 1901) was chief of the general staff of the Portuguese armed forces from 1958 to 1961 and chairman of the NATO Military Committee from 1959 to 1960.

References

External links 

NATO military personnel
Portuguese army personnel
1901 births
Year of death missing